Christen Christensen (1826–1900) was a Norwegian military officer and politician.

He was born in Førde, but the family soon moved to Lærdal. As a military officer he became a lieutenant in 1845, and later colonel. He eventually settled in Vik, where he worked with post services, bank administration and breeding of farm animals, importing Leicester sheep from England.

As a politician he was mayor of Vik from 1858 to 1861 and 1866 to 1873. He served as a deputy representative to the Norwegian Parliament in 1862 and 1865.

References

1826 births
1900 deaths
Norwegian Army personnel
Deputy members of the Storting
Mayors of places in Sogn og Fjordane
People from Førde
People from Vik